Habib Mohammed (born 4 July 1997) is a Ghanaian footballer who plays as a centre-back for Ghanaian Premier League side Dreams. He previously featured for Ashanti Gold and Asante Kotoko.

Club career

Ashanti Gold 
Mohammed started his career with Division Two side Allah Koso FC, moved to Aston Villa FC and later joined a Division One League side Bofoakwa Tano all in Brong Ahafo. In January 2017, Mohammed joined Ghana Premier League club Ashanti Gold on a two-year deal. He made his debut on 22 February 2017, in a 1–1 draw against Tema Youth.

Asante Kotoko 
In January 2019, Mohammed signed for Asante Kotoko on a three-year contract. He made his debut for the club 10 April 2019 during the 2019 GFA Normalization Committee Competition coming on as an 85th minute substitute for Jordan Opoku in a 2–0 victory over his former club Ashanti Gold. Asante Kotoko went on to win the special competition defeating Karela United in the play-off championship final. Even though Mohammed played 22 league matches in the 2020–21 season, he was deemed surplus after Prosper Narteh Ogum was appointed as the head coach. His contract was then mutually terminated in September 2021 with four months remaining on the contract.

Dreams 
On 24 October 2021, Dreams announced that they had signed Mohammed on a one-year deal with an option to extend at the end of the 2021–22 season. On 7 November, he made his debut after coming on in the 85th minute for Victor Oduro in Dreams's 3–1 league victory over Elmina Sharks. He made his first start for Dreams on 5 December in a 2–1 win over Bibiani Gold Stars. He was adjudged the man of the match at the end of full time.

International career
Mohammed made his senior debut on 26 November 2018, during a Dr. Hage Geingob Cup match against Namibia which ended in a 4–1 penalty shootout lose after the match ended in a 1–1 draw.

In 2019, he played a Black Stars B CHAN qualifier against Burkina Faso and was a member of the squad that placed second in the 2019 WAFU tournament held in Senegal. Mohammed was part of the Ghana U23 team that played the 2019 Africa U-23 Cup of Nations in Egypt. He played 5 games and scored one. His goal came in Ghana's opening match against Cameroon when he scored a late equalizer with three minutes to the end of the match.

Personal life 
In August 2021, Mohammed was invited by the Bono Regional Police Service for causing an alleged distraction and fight at a Pub & Night Club in Sunyani in the process hurting the facility owner.

Honours
Asante Kotoko 
 Normalization Committee Special Competition: 2019

Ghana
 WAFU Cup of Nations runner-up: 2019

References

External links
 
 
 

Living people
1997 births
Ghanaian footballers
Association football defenders
Ghana Premier League players
Ashanti Gold SC players
Asante Kotoko S.C. players
Dreams F.C. (Ghana) players
Ghana international footballers
Ghana youth international footballers